Jack Albert Crouch (October 12, 1903 – August 25, 1972) was a Major League Baseball catcher. He played for the St. Louis Browns in 1930, 1931, and 1933, and played for the Cincinnati Reds in 1933.

Crouch was the uncle of Chuck Scrivener, who played for the Detroit Tigers between 1975 and 1977.

External links
Jack Crouch at Baseball-Reference

1903 births
1972 deaths
St. Louis Browns players
Cincinnati Reds players
Major League Baseball catchers
Baseball players from North Carolina
People from Cooleemee, North Carolina
Knoxville Smokies players
Augusta Tygers players
Joplin Miners players
Wichita Falls Spudders players
Milwaukee Brewers (minor league) players
Nashville Vols players
Toronto Maple Leafs (International League) players
Columbus Red Birds players
Rochester Red Wings players
Birmingham Barons players